This is a list of the top-level leaders for religious groups with at least 50,000 adherents, and that led anytime from January 1, 201, to December 31, 300. It should likewise only name leaders listed on other articles and lists.

Christianity

Chalcedonian Christianity
Church of Rome (complete list) –
Zephyrinus, Bishop of Rome (199–217)
Callixtus I, Bishop of Rome (217–222)
Hippolytus, Antipope (217–235)
Urban I, Bishop of Rome (222–230)
Pontian, Bishop of Rome (230–235)
Anterus, Bishop of Rome (235–236)
Fabian, Bishop of Rome (236–250)
Cornelius, Bishop of Rome (251–253)
Novatian, Antipope (251–258) 
Lucius I, Bishop of Rome (253–254)
Stephen I, Bishop of Rome (254–257)
Sixtus II, Bishop of Rome (257–258)
Dionysius, Bishop of Rome (259–268)
Felix I, Bishop of Rome (269–274)
Eutychian, Bishop of Rome (275–283)
Caius, Bishop of Rome (283–296)
Marcellinus, Bishop of Rome (296–304)

Church of Constantinople (complete list) –
 Marcus I, Bishop of Byzantium (198–211)
Philadelphus, Bishop of Byzantium (211–217)
Cyriacus I, Bishop of Byzantium (217–230)
Castinus, Bishop of Byzantium (230–237)
Eugenius I, Bishop of Byzantium (237–242)
Titus, Bishop of Byzantium (242–272)
Dometius, Bishop of Byzantium (272–284)
Rufinus I, Bishop of Byzantium (284–293)
Probus, Bishop of Byzantium (293–306)

Church of Alexandria (complete list) –
Demetrius I, Hierarch of Alexandria (189–232)
Heraclas, Hierarch of Alexandria (232–248)
Dionysius, Hierarch of Alexandria (248–264)
Maximus, Hierarch of Alexandria (265–282)
Theonas, Hierarch of Alexandria (282–300)
Peter I, Hierarch of Alexandria (300–311)

Church of Antioch (complete list) –
Serapion, Bishop of Antioch (190/191–211/212) 
Asclepiades, Bishop of Antioch (211/212–217/218/220) 
Philetus, Bishop of Antioch (217/218/220–230/231) 
Zebinnus, Bishop of Antioch (231–237) 
Babylas, Bishop of Antioch (237–250/251) 
Fabius, Bishop of Antioch (250/251–253/256) 
Demetrius, Bishop of Antioch (253/256–260/261) 
Paul of Samosata, Bishop of Antioch (260/261–268/272) 
Domnus I, Bishop of Antioch (268–273) 
Timaeus, Bishop of Antioch (273–279/280) 
Cyril, Bishop of Antioch (279/280–303)

Church of Jerusalem (complete list) –
Narcissus, Bishop of Aelia Capitolina (185–???; deposed then restored, died in 216)
 Dius, Bishop of Aelia Capitolina
Germanion, Bishop of Aelia Capitolina
Gordius, Bishop of Aelia Capitolina (to 211) 
Alexander, Bishop of Aelia Capitolina (231–249)
Mazabanis, Bishop of Aelia Capitolina (249–260)
Imeneus, Bishop of Aelia Capitolina (260–276)
Zamudas, Bishop of Aelia Capitolina (276–283)
Ermon, Bishop of Aelia Capitolina (283–314)

Judaism

Rabbinic Judaism

Nasi of the Sanhedrin
Judah, Nasi (165–220)
Gamaliel III, Nasi (220–230)
Judah II, Nasi (230–270)
Gamaliel IV, Nasi (270–c.290)
Judah III, Nasi (c.290–320)

Exilarch
Huna Kamma, Exilarch (c. 200)
Mar Ukva, Exilarch (c. 226)
Rav Huna, Exilarch (to 297)

See also

Religious leaders by year

References

03rd century
Religious leaders
 
Religious Leaders